Suzanne Riccio-Major (born October 16, 1963), also known as Suzanne Riccio, is a former female boxer who fought two times for world titles. She also competed against many of women's boxing top fighters.

Riccio-Major was born in Pittsfield, Massachusetts in 1963. She began her career in professional boxing at the age of twenty-six, when she and Andrea Buchanan drew (tied) after five rounds on November 1, 1989, at Bristol, Tennessee. Riccio Major obtained her first victory, a five-round decision win over Stacey Prestage, on her second bout, held on November 17, 1990 in Fort Myers, Florida.

For her third bout, held on February 25, 1991, also at Bristol, she met young rising star Christy Martin, who dealt Riccio her first loss, beating her by a five-round decision.

Riccio then took five years away from boxing, deciding to return during the dawn of the often called "golden era of women's boxing", when she took on Sue Chase on June 3, 1996, at Warrensville Heights, Ohio. The then thirty-three-year-old Riccio won by a five-round decision. On July 27, she lost to Theresa Arnold by an eight-round decision at Rochester, Washington.

On January 17, 1997, Riccio-Major earned her first, and only, professional boxing knockout win, when she defeated Patricia Simms in the first round, at Waukegan, Illinois.

After that victory, she was offered her first shot at a world championship, when she met Cheryl Robertson, on February 3, for the WIBF's world bantamweight title. Riccio-Major lost by a ten-round decision, in New Orleans.

Immediately after that title shot, Riccio-Major was offered another world title try, when she fought with the IFBA world Flyweight champion. Yvonne Trevino, in Biloxi. Once again, she lost by a ten-round decision.

After that defeat, she scored three wins in a row, two against Karina Hernandez Gastelum. She suffered, however, a three fight losing streak after those three wins, being defeated by "Downtown Leona Brown" on points, by Trevino in a rematch which saw both women go down, by Tko in five rounds, when referee, the late Mitch Halpern stepped in for no apparent reason. a ref not wanted by the major team [ex Husband/Trainer, William Major] initially for his anti women boxing views. Trevino and her manager Jackie Kallen promised a rematch which never materialized and to Kathy Williams in her only fight abroad, on points. The fight with Williams was held in Canada.

On July 28 of 2000, she got her last career win, beating Larissa Smith in Boston by a six-round decision. After losing to Jamillia Lawrence by knockout in two on August 25 of that year in Saratoga Springs, New York, she retired from boxing in 2001.

Riccio-Major had 7 wins, 8 losses some controversial and one draw in professional boxing, with one win by knockout.

Professional boxing record

References

1963 births
Living people
American women boxers
Sportspeople from Pittsfield, Massachusetts
Super-bantamweight boxers
21st-century American women